Androsace albana is a species of flowering plant in the primrose family, Primulaceae. It is native to Iran, the Transcaucasus and Turkey. It was first described by Christian von Steven in 1812.

References

albana
Plants described in 1812
Flora of Iran
Flora of the Transcaucasus
Flora of Turkey